Jessie DeZiel (born August 12, 1993) is an American artistic gymnast. She currently attends University of Nebraska and was a member of their gymnastics team, from 2012 to 2015.

Club career 
DeZiel is a five-time J.O. Nationals qualifier (2007–11) and is a two-time J.O. National Champion (2010–11). In her final club career, in 2011, Jessie qualified to Senior International Elite and advanced to U.S. Nationals. She was named to the U.S. Senior National team and then later, was named to the USA's team to the 2011 Pan American Games in Guadalajara, Mexico. She won a team gold and qualified to the floor final, finishing sixth.

College career 
Jessie started at the University of Nebraska in the fall of 2011 and is graduating in 2015. She has competed at three NCAA Championships (2012–14) and is a 5-time All-American. She finished her senior career at the 2015 NCAA Gymnastics championship.

Personal life 
DeZiel graduated from Spectrum High School in 2011. Her sister, Brittany DeZiel, is a gymnast at UW-Stout

References 

1993 births
American female artistic gymnasts
Living people
Pan American Games medalists in gymnastics
Pan American Games gold medalists for the United States
People from Crystal, Minnesota
People from Rogers, Minnesota
U.S. women's national team gymnasts
Gymnasts at the 2011 Pan American Games
Medalists at the 2011 Pan American Games
21st-century American women